Seethammadhara is a neighborhood in the city of Visakhapatnam, India. The neighborhood is considered as the major residential area in the district. It is located within the jurisdiction of the Greater Visakhapatnam Municipal Corporation, which is responsible for the civic amenities in Seethammadhara. It is located in the central of Visakhapatnam city.

Seethammadhara mandal is one of the 46 mandals of Visakhapatnam District. It is under the administration of Visakhapatnam revenue division and the headquarters is located at Seethammadhara. The Mandal is bounded by Gopalapatnam, Maharanipeta and Bheemunipatnam mandals.

Wards 
Seethammadara Mandal consists of following wards

Location and Geography

Seethammadara is located about 12 km from Visakhapatnam Airport and about 6 km from Visakhapatnam railway station. It lies to the north-west of Visakhapatnam City and is loosely bordered by Maddilapalem to the south and MVP Colony to the east, Gopalapatnam to the west, Maharanipeta to the south-east.

Hospitals
The nearest major hospitals to Seethammadhara are Queens NRI Hospital, NRI Hospital, and Lions Cancer Hospital which is well known for the cancer treatment facilities available.

Transport
Seethammadhara is well connected to most locations of the city by the state-owned bus service, APSRTC. Apart from the city buses many RTC and private operators run inter-city buses with Seethammadhara as a starting point.

APSRTC routes

References

Neighbourhoods in Visakhapatnam